Arthur 3: The War of the Two Worlds (French: Arthur 3: La Guerre des deux mondes) is a 2010 English-language French fantasy animated/live-action directed and co-written by Luc Besson. It is based on the fourth book of the Arthur children's books series by Besson. It is the sequel to Arthur and the Revenge of Maltazard (2009) and the third installment in the Arthur film series. The film was shot back-to-back with the previous installment.

Arthur 3: The War of the Two Worlds was released theatrically in France on 13 October 2010 by EuropaCorp. The film received mixed reviews from critics and was a box-office success in France. However, following its two predecessor's under-performance at the box-office internationally, the film generated huge losses for EuropaCorp.

It is the last installment in the main series. A spin-off, Arthur, malédiction, was released in France in 2022.

Plot 
Picking up after the second film, Maltazard has assumed human size, and left Arthur in miniature. Accompanied by Princess Selenia and her brother, Prince Betameche, Arthur attempts to retrieve an enlarging potion from his house, which Maltazard seizes to enlarge his followers, whereafter Arthur returns to human form using an Elixir of Life given by a queen bee. Archibald convinces Darkos, Maltazard's son, to change sides, and enlarges him with a second potion. Arthur and Darkos then confront Maltazard, until Selenia and Betameche shrink Maltazard back to his Minimoy size and Arthur captures him, while the U.S. Army overcome Maltazard's forces. Maltazard thereafter remains a prisoner of Arthur's family.

Cast 
 Live-action cast
 Freddie Highmore as Arthur Montgomery. Highmore also voice Arthur in animation.
 Mia Farrow as Daisy Suchot
 Ron Crawford as Archibald Suchot. The character is voiced by actor Michel Duchaussoy in the French version.
 Robert Stanton as Armand Montgomery. The character is voiced by actor Jean-Paul Rouve in the French version.
 Penny Balfour as Rose Montgomery. The character is voiced by actress Frédérique Bel in the French version.
 Jean Betote Njamba as the chief of the Matassalai.
 Cooper Daniels as George Lucas
 Steve Routman as Dr. Stitch
 Norman Stokle as the mayor
 Dashiell Eaves as Deputy Sheriff Simon Suchot

 Voice cast
 Selena Gomez as Princess Selenia. The character is voiced by singer Mylène Farmer in the French version.
 Doug Rand as Prince Betameche. The character is voiced by radio host Cartman in the French version. Rand also voice Clerk.
 Lou Reed as Maltazard. The character is voiced by actor Gérard Darmon in the French version.
 Iggy Pop as Prince Darkos. Pop replaced Jason Bateman, who voiced the character in the first film. The character is voiced by actor Marc Lavoine in the French version.
 David Gasman as Emperor Sifrat XVI. He also voice the Bogo Chief.

Reception 
On Rotten Tomatoes the film has an approval rating of 20% based on reviews from 5 critics.

David Nusiar of Reelfilm.com called the film "a mild improvement over its two predecessors" and gave it a score of 2 out of 5.

References

External links 
 

2010 films
2010 fantasy films
2010s children's adventure films
2010s fantasy adventure films
French children's adventure films
French fantasy adventure films
Films scored by Éric Serra
Films with live action and animation
Films directed by Luc Besson
High fantasy films
Films produced by Luc Besson
EuropaCorp films
Films about shapeshifting
Films about size change
2010s children's fantasy films
English-language French films
2010s English-language films
2010s French films